is a railway station operated by the Kominato Railway Company's Kominato Line, located in Ichihara, Chiba Prefecture, Japan. It is 22.0 kilometers from the western terminus of the Kominato Line at Goi Station.

History
Kazusa-Kubo Station was opened on April 10, 1933. It has been unattended since 1956.

Lines
Kominato Railway Company
Kominato Line

Station layout
Kazusa-Kubo Station has a single side platform serving bidirectional traffic. There is a small rain shelter built on the platform, but no station building.

Platforms

Adjacent stations

External links
  Kominato Railway Company home page

Railway stations in Japan opened in 1933
Railway stations in Chiba Prefecture